MCCC may refer to:

Education
 Mercer County Community College, New Jersey, United States
 Monroe County Community College, Michigan, United States
 Montgomery County Community College, Pennsylvania, United States
 Mount Carmel Catholic College, Varroville, New South Wales, Australia

Biology and medicine
 Marie Curie Cancer Care, a British charity
 Mayo Clinic Cancer Center, a research institute in the United States
 MCCC1 and MCCC2, genes that encode methylcrotonyl-CoA carboxylase

Sports
 Midwest Christian College Conference, an athletics body in the United States
 Mid-Central College Conference, former name of the Crossroads League, an athletics body of Christian colleges in the Midwestern United States
 Minor Counties Cricket Championship, in England
 Middlesex County Cricket Club, a cricket venue in England
 Monte Carlo Country Club, a tennis venue in the south of France

Other
 1300 in Roman numerals
 Maneuver Captains Career Course, U.S. Army
 Missile combat crew commander, U.S. Air Force